The Montopolis Bridge is a historic Parker through truss bridge in Austin, Texas. It is located in the Montopolis neighborhood where a bicycle and pedestrian walkway crosses the Colorado River in southeastern Travis County. The bridge consists of five 200-foot Parker through truss spans and four 52-foot steel I-beam approach spans resting on reinforced concrete abutments. It was added to the National Register of Historic Places on October 10, 1996.

History
On June 15, 1935, the city of Austin suffered a devastating flood along the Colorado River. The original Montopolis bridge, built by Travis County in the late 1880s, was one of five bridges washed away by the flood. The Texas Highway Department designed the current bridge and requested federal emergency relief funds from the Bureau of Public Roads to rebuild it. Work on the bridge began on February 15, 1937. The bridge was completed on February 11, 1938, by Vincennes Steel Corporation under contract to the Highway Department at a cost of nearly $232,000.

The Montopolis Bridge remained in use until 2018 and, as one of the principal routes to the Austin-Bergstrom International Airport from Downtown Austin, was fairly busy. The southbound frontage of U.S. 183, Airport Boulevard and East 7th Street all merge at the north side of the bridge. In 2006, 29,200 vehicles crossed on average each day. The bridge was decommissioned for vehicular traffic on October 8, 2018, and was subsequently converted to a bicycle and pedestrian bridge as part of the Bergstrom Expressway Project.

See also

 List of crossings of the Colorado River
 National Register of Historic Places listings in Travis County, Texas
 List of bridges on the National Register of Historic Places in Texas

References

External links

Bridges in Austin, Texas
Pedestrian bridges in Texas
Cyclist bridges in the United States
Bridges completed in 1938
National Register of Historic Places in Austin, Texas
Bridges on the National Register of Historic Places in Texas
Bridges over the Colorado River (Texas)
Steel bridges in the United States
Parker truss bridges in the United States
1938 establishments in Texas
U.S. Route 183